Aden Country Park is located in Mintlaw, Aberdeenshire, Scotland, first mentioned in the 10th-century Book of Deer. The park has a caravan area with camping, a small shop, a small cafe near the agricultural museum, a play area, the maintained ruins of Aden House, landscaped gardens, and a barbecue area. Aden Park can be accessed from Mintlaw by Station Road or Nether Aden Road.

It is home to the Aberdeenshire Farming Museum, forest walks and a ruined country house. Every year it hosts a pipe band contest which attracts bagpipe bands from around Scotland.

Aberdeenshire Farming Museum
The Aberdeenshire Farming Museum comprises two main features. The early 19th-century semicircular Home Farm steading features interpretations of the 20th-century Aden Estate through costumed guides, and the "Weel Vrocht Grun" (well-worked ground) contains displays about the regional farming history and innovations in agriculture over the last two centuries.

The Hareshowe Working Farm was moved to Aden Country Park in the early 1990s. The farmhouse has been restored to a 1950s appearance and guided tours provide demonstrations of cooking and farm activities.

Aden House

The mansion house was originally granted to the Keith family in 1324, from whom it passed to the Russells of Montcoffer. It was said to have been beautiful before it was ruined. 
Alexander Russell of Montcoffer (1723–98) bought the Aden estate in 1758 from James Ferguson of Kinmundy.

John Smith reconstructed the mansion in 1832 with "a magnificent balustraded west wing and Doric-columned, domed, projecting west bow".

Alexander Russell's great-great-grandson, Sidney Russell (1895-1965), was the last Russell laird to live at Aden. He sold the estate in 1937 and moved to Dorset.
The Barony of Aden is still held by the Russell family.

During World War II, it was used as an army barracks, and it is said that the inside decoration was damaged and had lost its lustre once the army was finished with it. After the war, the house was left to fall into ruin. As of 1990, only its outside walls remained standing.

The house is made of grey granite.

References

Bibliography

External links
 Aden Country Park Website
 Aberdeenshire Council Website - Aden Country Park
 Aberdeenshire Farming Museum Website
 Aberdeenshire Council Website - Aberdeenshire Farming Museum
 Local Information on the Park

Country parks in Scotland
Parks in Aberdeenshire